Uta is a feminine given name and a surname. People with the name include:

Historical
Uta, daughter of Theodo, member of the Agilolfings family and ruler of Bavaria in the 8th century
Uta of Schauenburg (c. 1115/1120—c. 1197), sovereign countess
Uta von Ballenstedt (c. 1000-1046), mediaeval aristocrat

Given name
, Japanese judoka
Uta Barth (born 1958), German-American photographer
Uta Bresan (born 1965), German musical artist
Uta Briesewitz (born 1967), German cinematographer and television director
Uta Erickson, Norwegian actress 
Uta Felgner (born 1951), German businesswoman
Uta Francke (born 1942), German-American physician
Uta Frith (born 1941),  German developmental psychologist 
Uta Frommater (born 1948), German swimmer
Uta Gerhardt (born 1938), German academic and sociologist
Uta Hagen (1919–2004), German actress
Uta-Maria Heim (born 1963), German writer
Uta Ibrahimi (born 1983), Albanian alpinist 
Uta Kargel (born 1981), German actress
Uta Klement (born 1962), German academic
Uta Levka (born 1942), German actress 
Uta Merzbach (1933–2017), German-American mathematician
Uta Nickel (born 1941), German politician
Uta Pippig (born 1965), German long-distance runner
Uta Poreceanu (1936–2018), Romanian artistic gymnast
Uta Ranke-Heinemann (1927–2021), German theologian, academic and author
Uta Rohländer (born 1969), German sprinter
Uta Schmuck (born 1949), German swimmer
Uta Schütz (born 1955), German swimmer
Uta Streckert (born 1994), German paralympic athlete
Uta Weyand, German pianist

Surname
Constantin Uţă (born 1962), Romanian wrestler

Fictional characters
Uta Utane, fictional character in Utau

German feminine given names
Japanese feminine given names
Romanian-language surnames
Romanian feminine given names